Kostas Themistocleous is a Cypriot politician.

He studied Economics and political sciences in Athens. He also studied MSc Economics Developing in London.

He is married with Avgi Lymbouri and has 2 daughters and 1 son.

Themistocleous was a Minister of Agriculture, Natural Resources and Environment in the G. Kliridis' government, member of the United Democrats and was independent candidate of Cypriot presidential election. He gained only 0.17%.

He was one of the supporters of the Annan Plan for Cyprus.

References 

1949 births
Living people
United Democrats politicians
Cyprus Ministers of Agriculture, Natural Resources and the Environment